Marta Vančurová (born 7 September 1948) is a Czech actress. She has finished the Faculty of Theatre (Prague) and appeared in more than 30 films and television shows since 1970. In 2019, she performed in several shows at the Theatre Studio DVA.

Selected filmography
 Lovers in the Year One (1973)
 Jáchyme, hoď ho do stroje! (1974)
 Day for My Love (1976)
 Forbidden Dreams (1986)
 Men in Rut (2009)

References

External links

1948 births
Living people
Czech film actresses
Actresses from Prague
Czech stage actresses
Academy of Performing Arts in Prague alumni
20th-century Czech actresses
21st-century Czech actresses